The 1930 Dartmouth Indians football team was an American football team that represented Dartmouth College as an independent during the 1930 college football season. In their fourth season under head coach Jackson Cannell, the Indians compiled a 7–1–1 record, shut out five of nine opponents, and outscored opponents by a total of 301 to 43.

Harold Andres was the team captain. Willard C. Wolff was the team's leading scorer with 43 points scored on six touchdowns and seven extra points. William H. Morton added 42 points on seven touchdowns.

Schedule

References

Dartmouth
Dartmouth Big Green football seasons
Dartmouth Indians football